Elections to the Kentucky House of Representatives were held on November 8, 2022, as part of the biennial 2022 United States elections.

Retirements

Democrats
District 38: McKenzie Cantrell retired to run for Kentucky Court of Appeals from the 4th Appellate District.
District 41: Attica Scott retired to run for U.S. representative from Kentucky's 3rd congressional district.
District 44: Joni Jenkins retired.
District 75: Kelly Flood retired.

Republicans
District 15: Melinda Gibbons Prunty retired.
District 17: Steve Sheldon retired.
District 21: Bart Rowland retired.
District 25: Jim DuPlessis retired.
District 36: Jerry T. Miller retired.
District 68: Joseph Fischer retired to run for Kentucky Supreme Court from District 6.
District 82: Regina Bunch retired.

Incumbents defeated

In primaries

Democrats
District 30: Tom Burch lost renomination to Daniel Grossberg.
District 41: Mary Lou Marzian lost renomination to fellow incumbent Josie Raymond in a redistricting race.
District 79: Susan Westrom lost renomination to Chad Aull.

Republicans
District 12: Lynn Bechler lost renomination to fellow incumbent Jim Gooch in a redistricting race.
District 50: Chad McCoy lost renomination to Candy Massaroni.
District 60: Sal Santoro lost renomination to Marianne Proctor.
District 66: C. Ed Massey lost renomination to Steve Rawlings.
District 69: Adam Koenig lost renomination to Steven Doan.
District 97: Norma Kirk-McCormick lost renomination to fellow incumbent Bobby McCool in a redistricting race.

Predictions

Closest races 
Seats where the margin of victory was under 10%:
 
  (gain)

References

See also 

 Elections in Kentucky

Kentucky House
November 2022 events in the United States
Kentucky House of Representatives elections
2022 Kentucky elections